Walter Offley (15 July 1682 – 18 August 1721) was an English Anglican priest, most notably Dean of Chester  from 1718 until his death.

Offley was born in Crewe and educated at Oriel College, Oxford. He was also concurrently the Archdeacon of Staffordshire. He was Chaplain to Henry Herbert, 2nd Baron Herbert of Chirbury.

Notes

1682 births
1721 deaths
18th-century English Anglican priests
Deans of Chester
Alumni of Oriel College, Oxford
People from Crewe